Arthur Frayler is an American competitive swimmer from Fort Washington, Pennsylvania. He was a national team member and attended the University of Florida.

College career 
Frayler attended the University of Florida starting in 2013. He was honored as an All-SEC Freshman Honoree in 2013 and was named to the All-SEC First Team in 2014. In the same year, he was the SEC champion in the 1650 yard freestyle. He was named to the All-SEC Second Team in both 2015 and 2016. In 2015, a 15th-place finish in the 1650 at the NCAA championships earned him an honorable mention.

Professional career 
Frayler won gold in the 1500m and silver in the 10 km at the 2011 Pan American Games. He also swam at the 2012 Olympic Team Trials in Omaha, Nebraska. He placed 5th in the 1500m freestyle. Frayler competed at the 2014 Phillips 66 National Championships, where he had top-six finishes in both the 800m freestyle and 1500m freestyle.

References

Swimmers at the 2011 Pan American Games
Swimmers from Pennsylvania
Living people
Pan American Games medalists in swimming
Pan American Games gold medalists for the United States
Pan American Games silver medalists for the United States
People from Upper Dublin Township, Pennsylvania
Year of birth missing (living people)
Medalists at the 2011 Pan American Games